Semra may refer to:

 Semra (given name)
 Semra, Bhopal, a village in Madhya Pradesh, India
 Semra, Buxar, a village in Bihar, India
 Semra, Gopalganj, a village in Bihar, India
 Semra, Lucknow, a village in Uttar Pradesh, India